T-Kernel is an open source real-time operating system (RTOS) designed for 32-bit microcontrollers. It is standardized by the T-Engine Forum, which distributes it under a T-License agreement. There is also a corresponding Micro T-Kernel (μT-Kernel) implementation designed for embedded systems with 16-bit or 8-bit microcontrollers.

History
In 1984 professor Ken Sakamura started The Real-time Operating system Nucleus (TRON project) at the University of Tokyo, with the goal of designing an open real-time operating system (RTOS) kernel. The TRON framework defines a complete architecture for the different computing units. Industrial TRON (ITRON) is the most popular TRON architecture. ITRON specification promotion was done by the various companies which sell the commercial implementations. T-Kernel is the name of the specification and at the same time a single implementation based on the authorized source code available from the T-Engine Forum for free under T-License. T-Engine is arguably the most advanced ubiquitous computing platform in the world.

In 1989, Matsushita Electric Industrial Co., Ltd., now known as Panasonic Corporation, introduced a TRON PC. This personal computer had an Intel 80286 chip of 8 MHz and only 2 MB of memory, but it could display moving video. Also, it had a dual-booting system that could run both the TRON OS and DOS. Although the Japanese government once announced it would use the TRON PC in Japanese schools, the plan was dropped, partly due to economic issues with the United States.

But ITRON survived, and today is used in many devices, household appliances, automobile electronics, robots, some satellites, and in factory automation systems in China. Embedded system developers claim that ITRON is the number one OS for embedded chips in both Japan and the United States.

Overview
To make it easy to distribute middleware, T-Kernel has separate specification for subsystem and device driver which will be suitable for different types of middleware APIs. A real-time OS appropriate for individual application can be created by combining the middleware called T-Kernel Extension with the T-Kernel. T-Monitor initializes computer hardware and handles the interrupt set up at the start. T-Monitor lessens hardware-dependency of T-Kernel, and improves the application portability. T-Kernel consists of the following three components from the viewpoint of function.

T-Kernel/OS (operating system)
This offers the basic functions as real-time Operating System.

T-Kernel/SM (system manager)
This offers the functions including system memory management function and address space management function in order to manage middleware such as device drivers and subsystems.

T-Kernel/DS (debugger support)
This offers the functions for debuggers to be used in development tools.

Development environment
eBinder from eSol Corporation is one commonly used integrated development environment (IDE) for software cross-development targeting T-Kernel.

The current release of T-Kernel 2.0 is distributed with a plug-in for Eclipse IDE. Also, a version of T-Kernel that runs on QEMU based emulator, and the QEMU based emulator itself, are available so that testing, training, and development can be done on a PC without a target hardware. It is supported by popular SSL/TLS libraries such as wolfSSL.

See also
ThreadX

References

External links
, TRON Forum

Sakamura home page
ITRON Project Archive
Introducing the μT-Kernel
Information about T-Engine, T-Kernel, and μT-Kernel Programming

Embedded operating systems
TRON project